This is a list of butterflies found in the U.S. state of Oregon.

Hesperiidae, skippers
Epargyreus clarus, silver-spotted skipper
Thorybes pylades, northern cloudywing
Thorybes diversus, western cloudywing
Thorybes mexicana, Mexican cloudywing
Erynnis icelus, dreamy duskywing
Erynnis propertius, Propertius duskywing
Erynnis pacuvius, Pacuvius duskywing
Erynnis afranius, Afranius duskywing
Erynnis persius, Persius duskywing
Pyrgus ruralis, two-banded checkered-skipper
Pyrgus communis, common checkered-skipper
Heliopetes ericetorum, northern white-skipper
Pholisora catullus, common sootywing
Hesperopsis libya, Mohave sootywing
Carterocephalus palaemon, arctic skipper
Oarisma garita, garita skipperling
Hesperia uncas, Uncas skipper
Hesperia juba, Juba skipper
Hesperia colorado, western branded skipper
Hesperia columbia, Columbian skipper
Hesperia lindseyi, Lindsey's skipper
Hesperia nevada, Nevada skipper
Atalopedes campestris, sachem
Polites peckius, Peck's skipper
Polites sabuleti, sandhill skipper
Polites mardon, Mardon skipper
Polites themistocles, tawny-edged skipper
Polites mystic, long dash
Polites sonora, Sonora skipper
Ochlodes sylvanoides, woodland skipper
Ochlodes agricola, rural skipper
Ochlodes yuma, Yuma skipper
Euphyes vestris, dun skipper
Amblyscirtes vialis, common roadside-skipper

Papilionidae, parnassians and swallowtails
Parnassius clodius, Clodius parnassian
Parnassius smintheus, Rocky Mountain parnassian
Battus philenor, pipevine swallowtail
Papilio machaon, Old World swallowtail
Papilio machaon oregonius, Oregon swallowtail
Papilio zelicaon, anise swallowtail
Papilio indra, Indra swallowtail
Papilio rutulus, western tiger swallowtail
Papilio eurymedon, pale swallowtail
Papilio multicaudata, two-tailed swallowtail

Pieridae, whites and sulphurs
Anthocharis sara, Pacific orangetip
Anthocharis stella, Stella orangetip
Anthocharis lanceolata, gray marble
Euchloe ausonides, large marble
Euchloe lotta, desert marble
Euchloe hyantis, California marble
Neophasia menapia, pine white
Pieris marginalis, margined white
Pieris rapae, cabbage white
Pontia beckerii, Becker's white
Pontia protodice, checkered white
Pontia occidentalis, western white
Pontia sisymbrii, spring white
Colias philodice, clouded sulphur
Colias eurytheme, orange sulphur
Colias occidentalis, western sulphur
Colias alexandra, Queen Alexandra's sulphur
Colias pelidne, pelidne sulphur
Colias interior, pink-edged sulphur
Phoebis sennae, cloudless sulphur
Pyrisitia proterpia, tailed orange

Lycaenidae, gossamer-wing butterflies
Lycaena arota, tailed copper
Lycaena phlaeas, American copper
Lycaena cupreus, lustrous copper
Lycaena xanthoides, great copper
Lycaena editha, Edith's copper
Lycaena gorgon, gorgon copper
Lycaena rubidus, ruddy copper
Lycaena heteronea, blue copper
Lycaena helloides, purplish copper
Lycaena nivalis, lilac-bordered copper
Lycaena mariposa, mariposa copper
Euphilotes columbiae, Columbian blue
Habrodais grunus, golden hairstreak
Atlides halesus, great purple hairstreak
Callophrys affinis, western green hairstreak
Callophrys sheridanii, Sheridan's green hairstreak
Callophrys nelsoni, Nelson's hairstreak
Callophrys gryneus, juniper hairstreak
Callophrys spinetorum, thicket hairstreak
Callophrys johnsoni, Johnson's hairstreak
Callophrys augustinus, brown elfin
Callophrys mossii, Moss' elfin
Callophrys polios, hoary elfin
Callophrys eryphon, western pine elfin
Satyrium titus, coral hairstreak
Satyrium californica, California hairstreak
Satyrium sylvinum, sylvan hairstreak
Satyrium auretorum, gold-hunter's hairstreak
Satyrium tetra, mountain mahogany hairstreak
Satyrium saepium, hedgerow hairstreak
Satyrium behrii, Behr's hairstreak
Satyrium fuliginosum, sooty hairstreak
Satyrium semiluna, sagebrush sooty hairstreak
Strymon melinus, gray hairstreak
Leptotes marina, marine blue
Brephidium exilis, western pygmy-blue
Cupido comyntas, eastern tailed-blue
Cupido amyntula, western tailed-blue
Celastrina ladon, spring azure
Celastrina echo, echo azure
Glaucopsyche piasus, arrowhead blue
Glaucopsyche lygdamus, silvery blue
Philotiella leona, pumice dotted-blue
Euphilotes battoides, western square-dotted blue
Euphilotes intermedia, intermediate dotted-blue
Euphilotes enoptes, Pacific dotted-blue
Euphilotes ancilla, Rocky Mountain dotted-blue
Plebejus idas, northern blue
Plebejus anna, Anna's blue
Plebejus melissa, Melissa blue (includes Karner blue)
Icaricia saepiolus, greenish blue
Icaricia icarioides, Boisduval's blue
Icaricia shasta, Shasta blue
Icaricia acmon, Acmon blue
Icaricia lupini, lupine blue
Agriades podarce, Sierra Nevada blue

Riodinidae, metalmarks
Apodemia mormo, Mormon metalmark

Nymphalidae, brush-footed butterflies
Danaus plexippus, monarch
Danaus gilippus, queen
Euptoieta claudia, variegated fritillary
Speyeria cybele, great spangled fritillary
Speyeria coronis, Coronis fritillary
Speyeria zerene, zerene fritillary
Speyeria callippe, callippe fritillary
Speyeria egleis, Great Basin fritillary
Speyeria hesperis, northwestern fritillary
Speyeria hydaspe, Hydaspe fritillary
Speyeria mormonia, Mormon fritillary
Boloria selene, silver-bordered fritillary
Boloria bellona, meadow fritillary
Boloria epithore, pacific fritillary
Limenitis archippus, viceroy
Limenitis lorquini, Lorquin's admiral
Limenitis weidemeyerii, Weidemeyer's admiral
Adelpha californica, California sister
Chlosyne leanira, leanira checkerspot
Chlosyne hoffmanni, Hoffmann's checkerspot
Chlosyne acastus, sagebrush checkerspot
Chlosyne palla, northern checkerspot
Phyciodes orseis, California crescent
Phyciodes pallida, pale crescent
Phyciodes mylitta, Mylitta crescent
Phyciodes cocyta, northern crescent
Phyciodes pulchella, field crescent
Euphydryas gillettii, Gillette's checkerspot
Euphydryas editha, Edith's checkerspot
Euphydryas chalcedona, Chalcedon checkerspot
Euphydryas anicia, Anicia checkerspot
Euphydryas colon, colon checkerspot
Junonia coenia, common buckeye
Polygonia satyrus, satyr comma
Polygonia faunus, green comma
Polygonia gracilis, hoary comma
Polygonia zephyrus, zephyr comma
Polygonia progne, gray comma
Polygonia oreas, oreas comma
Aglais io, European peacock
Aglais milberti, Milbert's tortoiseshell
Nymphalis vaualbum, Compton tortoiseshell
Nymphalis antiopa, mourning cloak
Nymphalis californica, California tortoiseshell
Vanessa atalanta, red admiral
Vanessa cardui, painted lady
Vanessa annabella, West Coast lady
Vanessa virginiensis, American lady
Coenonympha tullia, common ringlet
Erebia epipsodea, common alpine
Neominois ridingsii, Ridings' satyr
Oeneis nevadensis, great arctic
Cercyonis pegala, common wood-nymph
Cercyonis sthenele, Great Basin wood-nymph
Cercyonis oetus, small wood-nymph

References 

Opler, Paul A., Harry Pavulaan, Ray E. Stanford, Michael Pogue, coordinators. 2006. Butterflies and Moths of North America. Bozeman, MT: Mountain Prairie Information Node.

Butterflies
Oregon
Oregon